Several theorems in mathematical analysis bear the name of Giuseppe Vitali:
 Vitali covering theorem in the foundations of measure theory
 Various theorems concerning convergence of families of measurable and holomorphic functions, such as Vitali convergence theorem
 Vitali also proved the existence of non-measurable subsets of the real numbers, see Vitali set